The Texas Outlaws were an American indoor soccer team founded in 2008. The team was a charter member of the Professional Arena Soccer League (PASL-Pro), the first division of arena (indoor) soccer in North America. The team disbanded in 2010.

Final roster

Year-by-year

Arenas
 NYTEX Sports Centre 2008-2009
 Arena Athletics  2009
 TCG Arena  2009–2010

Schedules/Results

External links
 Official website
 PASL official website

Defunct Professional Arena Soccer League teams
Indoor soccer clubs in the United States
North Richland Hills, Texas
Association football clubs established in 2008
Sports clubs disestablished in 2010
Defunct indoor soccer clubs in the United States
Sports in the Dallas–Fort Worth metroplex
Soccer clubs in Texas
2008 establishments in Texas
2010 disestablishments in Texas